Michael Asher may refer to:

 Michael Asher (artist) (1943–2012), American conceptual artist
 Michael Asher (explorer) (born 1953), British explorer and author, former SAS

See also
Mike Asher, fictional character from Marvel Comics